Crassula marnierana, common name Jade Necklace or Chinese Pagoda,  is a species of succulent flowering plant in the family Crassulaceae.

Description 
Crassula marnierana is a slow-growing small plant reaching a height of 15–20 cm. The thick rounded leaves are green with red edges. They are tightly stacked along the stem and store water, as they are covered with a cuticle to limit the evaporation. An inflorescence with small star-shaped pink-tinged flowers may appear on mature plants in winter if they are given proper conditions of temperature. This plant prefers direct light and as a houseplant is very easy to maintain.

Distribution
This species is native to South Africa, Lesotho and Eswatini.

References
 'Toelken' 1975. J. S. African Bot. 41 (2): 116.
 Crassula marnieriana , Cactus No. 31, Suppl., 8 1952.

 NCBI
 Crassulaceae.net
 Hortipedia

Gallery

marnierana